Elaphocephala is a fungal genus in the family Atheliaceae. The genus is monotypic, containing the single resupinate (crust-like) species Elaphocephala iocularis, found in Europe.

References

External links
 

Atheliales
Monotypic Basidiomycota genera